Daisuke Nakai (中井 大介, born November 27, 1989) is a Japanese professional baseball infielder for the Yokohama DeNA BayStars in Japan's Nippon Professional Baseball.

External links

1989 births
Japanese baseball players
Living people
Nippon Professional Baseball infielders
People from Ise, Mie
Yomiuri Giants players
Yokohama DeNA BayStars players